Teinostoma funiculatum is a species of minute sea snail, a marine gastropod mollusk or micromollusk in the family Tornidae.

Distribution
This species is endemic to the island of Príncipe, São Tomé and Príncipe.

References

Tornidae
Endemic fauna of Príncipe
Invertebrates of São Tomé and Príncipe
Gastropods described in 1991
Taxonomy articles created by Polbot